Sinanitsa is a marble peak in the northern part of the Pirin Mountains of southwestern Bulgaria.  high, Sinanitsa gives its name to the Sinanitsa Lateral Ridge, one of the four best pronounced lateral ridges in Pirin. Sinanitsa is also known as Chukata, Varovita Chuka or The Split Peak (Raztsepenia vrah ), the latter because of its unusual south face.

Though it gives its name to the entire ridge due to its characteristic shape, the "enchantingly beautiful" Sinanitsa is in fact lower than the ridge's highest point, Gergiytsa, which measures  metres and lies to the northwest. Sinanitsa is commonly regarded as one of the most beautiful peaks in Pirin and Bulgaria. On clear days, the summit is easily visible from the town of Sandanski.

The etymology of Sinanitsa's name is debated. It stems either from the Bulgarian word for "blue" (син, sin), due to the peak appearing in that colour from a distance, or from the Arabic  word sinan (سنان). The latter would describe it as a "spearhead" peak, referencing its sharp contours.

The Sinanitsa River, a tributary of the Vlahinska River that subsequently flows into the Struma, originates from the lake's underground waters. The Sinanitsa Gate is a steep and rocky col on the ridge connecting the Sinanitsa cirque with the Spano Pole cirque to the southeast. The Sinanitsa Hut is situated by the shores of the lake, within direct view of the summit. The summit can be reached in approximately an hour from the hut.

Sinanitsa's steep eastern face is a popular destination for alpine climbing. It was first scaled by Andrey Todorov and Vasil Nastev on 12 July 1949; the first winter ascent was accomplished on 27 April 1955 by Encho Petkov and Yordan Machirski.

References

Mountains of Pirin
Landforms of Blagoevgrad Province
Two-thousanders of Bulgaria